Taufkirchen an der Pram is a municipality in the district of Schärding in the Austrian state of Upper Austria.

Geography
Taufkirchen lies in the Innviertel. About 12 percent of the municipality is forest, and 79 percent is farmland.

Personalities 

 Peter Kubelka (born 1934), Austrian experimental filmmaker and artist, spent his childhood in Taufkirchen an der Pram
 Josef Mayer (1868-1940), Austrian politician and mayor of Taufkirchen
 Lukas Weißhaidinger (born 1992), athlete, discus thrower, lives in Taufkirchen on the Pram

References

Cities and towns in Schärding District